"The Ballad of Tom Jones" is a song by English band Space and Cerys Matthews, lead singer of Welsh band Catatonia. Lead singer Tommy Scott described Tom Jones as 'brilliant'. The song became a highly successful radio single, and resulted in Space performing with Jones in Jools Holland's' New Year's Eve television programme.

Released on 23 February 1998, the song peaked at number four in the United Kingdom, number 26 in Ireland, number 46 in Australia, and number 27 in New Zealand. It is the band's highest-selling single in their home country, earning a silver certification from the British Phonographic Industry (BPI) for sales of at least 200,000 copies.

Track listings
UK CD1 
 "The Ballad of Tom Jones" – 4:09
 "Happy Endings" – 3:08
 "Now She's Gone" – 2:36
 "Stress Transmissions" – 3:53

UK CD2 and Australian CD single 
 "The Ballad of Tom Jones" – 4:09
 "The Ballad of Tom Jones" (Cocktail Lounge mix) – 5:45
 "The Ballad of Tom Jones" (Dirty Beatniks mix) – 4:29
 "The Ballad of Tom Jones" (Sound 5 mix) – 6:48
 "The Ballad of Tom Jones" (Sure Is Pure dub mix) – 7:14
 "The Ballad of Tom Jones" (SX Dub "Scratchin' Cuckoo" mix) – 5:04
 "The Ballad of Tom Jones" (Tom Jones: Axe to Your Head mix) – 6:04

UK 7-inch single 
A. "The Ballad of Tom Jones" – 4:09
B. "Now She's Gone" – 2:36

UK cassette single 
 "The Ballad of Tom Jones" – 4:09
 "Happy Endings" – 3:08
 "Now She's Gone" – 2:36

Charts

Weekly charts

Year-end charts

Certifications

References

External links
 "The Ballad of Tom Jones" article

Space (English band) songs
1997 songs
1998 singles
Cultural depictions of pop musicians
Cultural depictions of Welsh men
Male–female vocal duets
Songs about musicians